The 1969 Critérium du Dauphiné Libéré, also known as the 1969 Criterium of the Six Provinces, was the 21st edition of the cycle race and was held from 25 May to 31 May 1969. The race started in Avignon and finished at Lyon. The race was won by Raymond Poulidor of the Mercier team.

Teams
Ten teams, containing a total of 100 riders, participated in the race:

 
 
 
 
 
 
 
 Italian team

Route

General classification

References

Further reading

1969
1969 in French sport
1969 Super Prestige Pernod
May 1969 sports events in Europe